Gauriganga Municipality  is a municipality in Kailali District in the Sudurpashchim Province. At the time of the 2011 Nepal census it had a population of 55,314 living in 5,293 individual households.  It is Surrounded by Ghodaghodi Municipality in the west, Godawari Municipality in the east, Mohanyal and Chure Rural Municipality in the north and Dhangadhi Sub Metropolitan City and Kailari Rural Municipality in the south.

Census
Total population of Gauriganga Municipality]] is 55,314,.  Khas Kshatriya  is the dominant caste followed by Tharu Damai(Dholi or Nepali) Luhar (Biswakarma) Ethnic group. Brahmin Ranked third with. The male to female sex-ratio is 96.47. Total 5,293 household.

References

External links
UN map of the municipalities of Kailali District
Official website of ddc Kaialali
City Population - Gauriganga Municipality in Nepal

Populated places in Kailali District
Municipalities in Kailali District
Nepal municipalities established in 2017